The 2018 South Dakota Coyotes football team represented the University of South Dakota in the 2018 NCAA Division I FCS football season. They were led by third-year head coach Bob Nielson and played their home games in the DakotaDome. They were a member of the Missouri Valley Football Conference. They finished the season 4–7, 3–5 in MVFC play to finish in a three-way tie for sixth place.

Previous season
The Coyotes finished the 2017 season 8–5, 4–4 in MVFC play to finish in a three-way tie for fifth place. They received an at-large bid to the FCS Playoffs, which was the schools first ever FCS Playoff bid, where they defeated Nicholls State in the first round before losing to Sam Houston State in the second round.

Preseason

Award watch lists

Preseason MVFC poll
The MVFC released their preseason poll on July 29, 2018, with the Coyotes predicted to finish in sixth place.

Preseason All-MVFC Teams
The Coyotes placed seven players on the preseason all-MVFC teams.

Offense

1st team

Shamar Jackson – WR

2nd team

Tyler Ciurej – OL

Nick Jensen – OL

Mason Scheidegger — OL

Defense

1st team

Darin Greenfield – DL

Andrew Gray – DB

2nd team

Brady Schutt – P

Schedule

Game summaries

at Kansas State

Kansas State's Isaiah Zuber was credited for saving the game with two key plays:  an 85-yard punt return with South Dakota leading 24–12.  Later in the game caught a touchdown pass from Skylar Thompson with 7:21 left to give K-State its first lead of the second half.

Kansas State scored all but seven of its points on field goals and special teams. Sophomore kicker Blake Lynch scored Kansas State’s first 12 points on field goals of 22, 24, 38 and 44 yards.  Kansas State racked up 13 penalties for 129 yards, but maintained more control of the ball with 37:39 of offense compared to South Dakota's 22:21. going over 100 years for the first time since 2016 against Florida Atlantic.

South Dakota quarterback Austin Simmons threw for 257 yards and one touchdown, continually finding receiver Levi Falck (11 catches, 140 yards) open against top K-State cornerback Duke Shelley.  The Coyotes led 24–12 at halftime.  ESPN reported "... one solid takeaway is how well the Coyotes were in control for much of the game. They did a great job limiting the Kansas State offense for three quarters and had many Kansas State fans, players and coaches frustrated throughout the night."

Northern Colorado

at Weber State

at Southern Illinois

Missouri State

Northern Iowa

at Youngstown State

North Dakota State

at Indiana State

Western Illinois

at South Dakota State

Ranking movements

References

South Dakota
South Dakota Coyotes football seasons
South Dakota Coyotes football